Frederick Stephen Seaman (January 2, 1906 – September 21, 2000) was an Indian field hockey player who won a gold medal as part of the Indian team in the 1928 Summer Olympics. Born to Thomas Henry Seaman, a police inspector, and his wife Martha Ann (O'Connor) Seaman, he later became a customs officer in British India. Frederick Seaman and his family left India after its independence in 1947, settling in Pennsylvania. He died at Hershey, Pennsylvania in 2004, age 94.

References

External links
 
 

1906 births
2000 deaths
Field hockey players from Allahabad
Olympic field hockey players of India
Field hockey players at the 1928 Summer Olympics
Indian male field hockey players
Olympic gold medalists for India
Anglo-Indian people
Olympic medalists in field hockey
Medalists at the 1928 Summer Olympics
Indian emigrants to the United States
American people of Anglo-Indian descent